Raymond William Phebus (August 2, 1909 – October 11, 1989) was a Major League Baseball pitcher. He played parts of three seasons in the majors, from  until , for the Washington Senators.

After his playing career ended, Phebus briefly managed in minor league baseball.

External links

Major League Baseball pitchers
Washington Senators (1901–1960) players
Bakersfield Bees players
Oakland Oaks (baseball) players
Mission Reds players
Davenport Blue Sox players
Albany Senators players
Chattanooga Lookouts players
Hollywood Stars players
Indianapolis Indians players
Wenatchee Chiefs players
Fresno Cardinals players
Minor league baseball managers
Baseball players from Kansas
People from Cherryvale, Kansas
1909 births
1989 deaths
Greenville Greenies players